USS Seawolf (SSN-575) was the third ship of the United States Navy to be named for the seawolf, the second nuclear submarine, and the only US submarine built with a liquid metal cooled (sodium), beryllium-moderated nuclear reactor, the S2G. This sonar arrangement resulted in an unusual bow shape above the water for a U.S. submarine. Her distinctive reactor was later replaced with a standard pressurized water reactor, the replacement process lasting from 12 December 1958 to 30 September 1960.

Comparison to Nautilus 

Seawolf was the same basic "double hull" twin-screw submarine design as her predecessor , but her propulsion system was more technologically advanced. The Submarine Intermediate Reactor (SIR) nuclear plant was designed by General Electric's Knolls Atomic Power Laboratory and prototyped in West Milton, New York. The prototype plant was eventually designated S1G and Seawolfs plant as S2G.

The Atomic Energy Commission historians' account of the sodium-cooled reactor experience was:
 The S2G reactor was replaced with a pressurized water reactor similar to Nautilus and designated S2Wa, the replacement process lasting from 12 December 1958 to 30 September 1960.

Although fully armed, Seawolf, like the first nuclear submarine, Nautilus, was primarily an experimental vessel.  Seawolf was originally thought of publicly as a hunter-killer submarine, but in fact was intended to be a one-off test platform for the SIR (aka S2G) LMFR reactor and future sonar platforms.  Its future uses, after the reactor plant was replaced with a light water system, included covert operations in foreign waters, for which it was converted January 1971 – June 1973.

Initial construction 

Seawolf'''s keel was laid down 7 September 1953, by the Electric Boat division of General Dynamics Corporation in Groton, Connecticut. It was launched on 21 July 1955 sponsored by Mary Elizabeth (Thomas) Cole, wife of New York Congressman W. Sterling Cole, and commissioned on 30 March 1957.

Like all of the original nuclear subs, the project manager at Electric Boat was the general manager of the company, Bill Jones.  During the parallel construction of the first nuclear submarines, the Navy, the Atomic Energy Commission, its independent labs, and the shipyard all worked together to learn together.

For the yard, the Power Plant Project manager was a separate function on these original nuclear subs.  Dennis B. Boykin III would lead EB's power plant installation, and return to the project two years later for the reactor conversion.  His counterpart at the Office of Naval Reactors, Gardner Brown, did the same.

Lieutenant James Earl "Jimmy" Carter, the only US President to qualify in submarines, was to be her Engineering Officer, but had resigned his commission upon the death of his father in 1953.

 1957–1959 Seawolf departed New London, Connecticut, on 2 April for her shakedown cruise off Bermuda and returned on 8 May. Between 16 May and 5 August, she made two voyages to Key West and participated in intensive training exercises. On 3 September, she steamed across the North Atlantic to participate in NATO exercises.  The submarine surfaced off Newport, Rhode Island, on 25 September after cruising 6,331 nonstop miles. The next day, President of the United States Dwight D. Eisenhower embarked and was taken for a short cruise onboard her.Seawolf cruised to the Caribbean Sea for an exercise in November. In December, she began an availability period that lasted until 6 February 1958. She then participated in exercises along the east coast until early August.Seawolf submerged on 7 August and did not surface again until 6 October. During this period, she logged over 13,700 nautical miles (25,400 km).  She received the Navy Unit Commendation for demonstrating the ability of the nuclear-powered submarine to remain independent of the atmosphere for the period of a normal war patrol.Seawolf returned to Electric Boat Company in Groton, Connecticut, on 12 December 1958, for conversion of her power plant from a S2G sodium-cooled LMFR to a S2Wa PWR. She was out of commission until 30 September 1960.  The Office of Naval Reactors had determined that the unique superheated steam powerplant was too difficult to maintain, since the superheaters were rarely operational.  Constructed of rolled steel (vs forged steel), the superheaters were usually unable to allow the plant to operate at full capacity.

On 18 April 1959, the Navy disposed of the radioactive S2G plant by sealing it in a 30-foot high stainless steel containment vessel, towing it out to sea on a barge, and then sinking the barge at a point about 120 miles due east of Maryland in 9,100 feet of water. Twenty-one years later, the Navy was unable to relocate the container, but said that the radioactive materials inside should decay before the containment vessel deteriorated.Facts on File 1980 Yearbook, p.458.

 1960–1966 Seawolf began a three-week period of independent operations on 25 October, and returned to fleet operations in November and December. On 9 January 1961, Seawolf sailed to San Juan, Puerto Rico, to participate in local operations. On 25 January, she was ordered to locate and track the Portuguese passenger liner Santa Maria which had been seized by pirates two days earlier. The submarine made contact with the liner off the coast of Brazil on 1 February. After Santa Maria surrendered in Recife, the submarine returned to San Juan and continued east coast operations.

On 7 July, Seawolf began a two-month oceanographic voyage which took her to Portsmouth, England, before returning the vessel to New London on 19 September 1961.

In 1963, Seawolf participated in the search for the lost USS Thresher (SSN-593) and in various local and fleet operations until April 1964. On 28 April, Seawolf stood out of New London en route to the Mediterranean Sea and a -month deployment with the Sixth Fleet. During the period, she operated with aircraft carrier Enterprise (CVAN-65), guided missile cruiser Long Beach (CGN-9), and guided missile frigate Bainbridge (DLGN-25) as a part of the world's first nuclear task force. More local East Coast exercises followed until 5 May 1965. On that date, the submarine entered the Portsmouth Naval Shipyard for refueling and an extensive overhaul bringing her up to the SUBSAFE standard put in place after the loss of Thresher. This overhaul lasted until September 1966.

 1967–1973 Seawolf sailed from Portsmouth, New Hampshire, on 24 August 1967 for New London, Connecticut, which was again her home port. The following month, she sailed to the Caribbean Sea for refresher training and weapons trials. She had to have a propeller replaced at Charleston, South Carolina, in early October and then conducted sea trials in the Bahama Islands for the remainder of the month. The end of the year 1967 found her back at her home port.Seawolf was operating from that port when she grounded off the coast of Maine on 30 January 1968, badly crushing her stern. She was towed back to New London, Connecticut, for repairs and did not put to sea again until 20 March 1969, when she began sea trials. The submarine was in the Caribbean Sea during June and July conducting underwater sound and weapons systems tests.  Seawolf was deployed with the Sixth Fleet from 29 September to 21 December 1969.Seawolf operated along the East Coast until 9 November 1970 when her home port was changed to Vallejo, California, and she sailed for the West Coast. The submarine transited the Panama Canal on 17 November and changed operational control to Submarine Force, Pacific Fleet. In the Pacific, Seawolf would serve as a "spy submarine", trailing other submarines, retrieving test weapons from the seabed, and tapping Soviet submarine communications cables.  

Upon arrival at Mare Island Naval Shipyard, she entered drydock on 8 January 1971 for overhaul and conversion to a special project platform.  The sense of the euphemistic 'special project platform' can be gleaned from photos of the ships from before and after the renovation.  The 52-foot hull extension forward of the sail held intelligence gathering equipment that supported covert operations, including an "aquarium" for launching variable depth sonar and retrieval equipment.  For precise maneuvering, she gained jet thrusters.  A saturation diver lockout was installed inside the hull, and a new gondola underneath the hull held retractable "skegs" (short for "sea keeping legs") for bottom station keeping.  The ship remained there until 21 June 1973, when she moved up the coast to Bangor, Washington. She would remain a special projects boat until its decommissioning.  Seawolf returned to Mare Island on 4 September 1973.  But despite the frequent rebuilds, age was beginning to wear on the craft.  Records describe frequent fires and reactor scrams, life-support oxygenation failures, and crewmembers on speed to maintain stamina.

 1974–1978 

In 1974, Seawolf completed post-conversion testing and evaluation period and conducted its first Pacific Fleet deployment, operating independently for a period of three months. For its performance of duty, it was awarded a second Navy Unit Commendation. In 1975, Seawolf came under the exclusive direction of Submarine Development Group One, and for outstanding performance in 1974–1975, was awarded a Battle Efficiency "E."

In 1976, Seawolf received its second consecutive Battle Efficiency "E" and the Engineering "E" for Excellence. During its second Pacific Fleet deployment, it conducted independent submerged operations for three months and demonstrated superior endurance by remaining submerged for 89 consecutive days, a U.S. Navy record. It received her third Navy Unit Commendation.

In 1977, Seawolf received its third Battle Efficiency "E" and her second Engineering "E" for Excellence. During its third Pacific Fleet deployment, it conducted 79 consecutive days of independent submerged operations and received its fourth Navy Unit Commendation and the Navy Expeditionary Medal. In 1978, Seawolf conducted its fourth Pacific Fleet deployment.

 1980–1987 

In February 1980, a turbine generator failed during sea trials, sending the ship back to drydock for a year.

In August 1981, Seawolf deployed on her fifth Pacific Fleet deployment. By that point, the struggles to maintain the aged boat had stressed crew morale close to breaking.  Between missions, crewmembers had participated makeshift target practice on mudflats near the base, or indulged in recreational marijuana contrary to naval regulations (and possible as a scheme to make themselves ineligible for duty).  Nevertheless, the ship proceeded to tap a submarine communications cable in the Sea of Okhotsk, where it found itself trapped by an extreme storm.  Although most submarines are isolated from surface weather by boundary layer effects, the typhoon was sufficiently strong to shake the Seawolf so that her skegs dug into the seabed, and clog the reactor heat exchanger with sand.  In freeing herself, the ship ripped away from the underbelly gondola, leaving interior parts free to bang against the hull.  Without classic submarine silence, the submarine was easily detected by a Soviet fishing trawler, but managed to outlast the ship into international waters.  The Seawolf returned to homeport in October 1981, and received the Navy Expeditionary Medal. 

In 1983, Seawolf conducted its sixth Pacific Fleet deployment of 76 days and returned to Mare Island Naval Shipyard in May 1983. She was awarded the Navy Expeditionary Medal, another Battle Efficiency "E," another Engineering "E," a Supply "E," and a Damage Control "DC." In 1984, Seawolf conducted a 93-day deployment to the Western Pacific, returned in July, and continued her high operating tempo with numerous local operations. She was awarded her third consecutive Supply "E," a Communications "C," and the Deck Seamanship Award.

In April 1986, Seawolf conducted her last Western Pacific deployment and returned to Mare Island in June 1986 to prepare for decommissioning. Decommissioned 30 March 1987, Seawolf'' was stricken from the Naval Vessel Register the following 10 July. The former submarine began the Navy's Ship-Submarine Recycling Program on 1 October 1996 and completed it on 30 September 1997.

Awards

 Navy Unit Commendation with three stars (4 awards)
 Meritorious Unit Commendation
 Navy "E" Ribbon (3 awards)
 Navy Expeditionary Medal with two stars (3 awards)
 National Defense Service Medal

References

External links 

    hazegray.org: USS Seawolf
  navsource.org: Photo gallery of USS Seawolf
  bio of President James Earl "Jimmy" Carter, Jr.
  World War II Submarine Veterans History Project

 

Submarines of the United States Navy
Experimental nuclear submarines of the United States Navy
Ships built in Groton, Connecticut
1955 ships
Cold War submarines of the United States